Alireza Vahedi Nikbakht (born 30 June 1980) is an Iranian football coach and former player.

He has played for Aboomoslem, Esteghlal, Al-Wasl, Persepolis, Steel Azin, Saba Qom, Paykan, Damash Gilan, Khoneh Be Khoneh, and the Iran national team for which he scored 14 goals.

Club career
In 2006, Vahedi Nikbakht joined Persepolis. In his second season, he won the league and had his best season of his career with nine goals and seven assists. In January 2008, Vahedi Nikbakht was invited to go on a trial with Sheffield United.

For the second half of the 2009–10 season, he joined Steel Azin.

He terminated his contract with Gahar Zagros and joins Damash Gilan.

On 1 July 2013, Vahedi Nikbakht returned to Esteghlal after seven years, signing a one-year contract.

Career statistics

Club

International
Scores and results list Iran's goal tally first.

Honours
Esteghlal
 Iran Pro League: 2000–01, 2005–06; runner-up: 2001–02, 2003–04
 Hazfi Cup: 1999–00, 2001–02; runner-up: 1998–99, 2003–04

Persepolis
 Persian Gulf Cup: 2007–08
 Hazfi Cup runner-up: 2006

Paykan
 Azadegan League: 2011–12

Iran
 Asian Games: 2002
 WAFF Championship: 2004
 AFC–OFC Challenge Cup: 2003

References

External links

 
 Alireza Vahedi Nikbakht at RSSSF
 Alireza Vahedi Nikbakht at PersianLeague.com
 Alireza Vahedi Nikbakht at TeamMelli.com

1980 births
Living people
Sportspeople from Mashhad
Iranian footballers
Association football wingers
F.C. Aboomoslem players
Esteghlal F.C. players
Al-Wasl F.C. players
Persepolis F.C. players
Steel Azin F.C. players
Saba players
Paykan F.C. players
Damash Gilan players
F.C. Rayka Babol players
Azadegan League players
Persian Gulf Pro League players
UAE Pro League players
Iran youth international footballers
Iran international footballers
Footballers at the 2002 Asian Games
Medalists at the 2002 Asian Games
Asian Games medalists in football
Asian Games gold medalists for Iran
Iranian expatriate footballers
Iranian expatriate sportspeople in the United Arab Emirates
Expatriate footballers in the United Arab Emirates